In the United States, commercial radio stations make most of their revenue by selling airtime to be used for running radio advertisements. These advertisements are the result of a business or a service providing a valuable consideration, usually money, in exchange for the station airing their commercial or mentioning them on air. The most common advertisements are "spot commercials", which normally last for no more than one minute, and longer programs, commonly running up to one hour, known as "informercials".

The United States Federal Communications Commission (FCC), established under the Communications Act of 1934, regulates commercial broadcasting, and the laws regarding radio advertisements remain relatively unchanged from the Radio Act of 1927. In 2015, radio accounted for 7.8% of total U.S. media expenditures.

History 
Commercial advertising by audio services goes back to even before the introduction of radio broadcasting, beginning with the 1893 establishment of telephone-based Telefon Hírmondó of Budapest, Hungary. As of 1901, this "telephone newspaper" was selling twelve-second spots for one forint each to reach the subscribers listening to the service's programming.

The first radio stations, introduced in the late 1800s, used crude spark transmitters, which could only transmit the dots-and-dashes of Morse code. Beginning in the early 1900s, the first transmitters capable of audio transmissions were invented, and although initially these were primarily used for point-to-point communication, there was concurrent experimentation with the broadcasting of news and entertainment. The test transmissions for many of these earliest stations were in effect advertisements for their owners and the new technology. However, it soon became a fairly common practice for stations to arrange to play phonograph records in exchange for mentioning on the air the companies which provided the records. The earliest known example of this practice occurred in July 1912, when Charles Herrold in San Jose, California began making weekly radio broadcasts from his technical school, with the initial broadcast featuring phonograph records supplied by the Wiley B. Allen company.

An even more ambitious effort took place in the fall of 1916, after the De Forest Radio Telephone & Telegraph Company began operating an experimental radio station, 2XG, in New York City. Lee de Forest made an arrangement with the Columbia Gramophone record company to broadcast phonograph records from their offices—the phonograph company supplied records in exchange for "announcing the title and 'Columbia Gramophone Company' with each playing". The debut program was aired on October 26, 1916 and it was announced that nightly transmissions of news interspersed with Columbia recordings would be sent from de Forest's Highbridge laboratory beginning on November 1. De Forest initially also took advantage of these broadcasts to advertise "the products of the De Forest Radio Co., mostly the radio parts, with all the zeal of our catalogue and price list", until comments by Western Electric engineers caused him to eliminate the sales messages. At the time, a commentator in QST magazine noted that 2XG's efforts showcased the practicality of "conducting regular advertising and news talks by radio" which was "decidedly something to think about".

Radio broadcasting was suspended in April 1917 after the United States entered World War One, when a government ban silenced civilian radio stations for the duration of the conflict. This ban was lifted in October 1919, and some additional promotional record broadcasts took place, including Westinghouse engineer Frank Conrad over experimental station 8XK, located at his home in Wilkinsburg, Pennsylvania, who provided on-air acknowledgements to the Brunswick Shop in exchange for the store supplying him with recently released records. A more formal example was a late October 1920 broadcast, over the Precision Equipment Company of Cincinnati, Ohio's experimental station, 9XB, that was sponsored by the Randolph Wurlitzer Company, and featured the Victor records that would go on sale in November. However, shortly after radio broadcasting became widely established in the United States in 1922, the record industry became concerned that instead of promoting sales the radio broadcasts were actually suppressing purchases, and these promotional broadcasts ended.

Many early broadcasting stations were put on the air by radio equipment manufacturers, such as Westinghouse Electric & Manufacturing Company and General Electric, and radio receiver sales agents, including department stores such as Gimbel's, Bamberger's and Wanamaker's. This provided their customers programming for their purchases, with the sales financing  station operations. But as more stations began operating, station owners were increasingly faced with the issue of how to continue to afford the costs, because operating a radio station became a significant expense, especially when it became the norm to pay performers, and after music publishers successfully argued that they were due royalties for the music the stations played.

In February 1922, the American Telephone & Telegraph Company (AT&T) announced it planned to begin establishing stations that would be dedicated to selling their airtime to interested parties, which AT&T called "toll broadcasting". Its primary station, WEAF in New York (now WFAN), aired its first paid radio commercial on August 28, 1922 for the Queensboro Corporation, advertising a new apartment complex in Jackson Heights, Queens, near the just-completed #7 subway line. Based on a series of industry cross-licensing agreements, AT&T initially claimed that its patent rights gave it a monopoly on commercial radio transmissions. Although the courts upheld this contention, the practice was widely disliked, and AT&T soon came up with a licensing scheme to allow individual stations to begin selling airtime.

It appears that a few other radio stations may have quietly sold airtime and carried paid advertising before WEAF. Frank V. Bremer reportedly leased his Jersey City, New Jersey amateur station, 2IA, to the Jersey Review in May 1920, for $35 for twice-a-week broadcasts, then on January 1, 1922 further leased the station for $50 to the Jersey Journal for a New Year's broadcast. Additionally, on April 4, 1922 Alvan T. Fuller reportedly purchased time on WGI of Medford Hillside, Massachusetts, in order to promote his Packard automobile dealership.

Initially the idea of radio advertising was extremely controversial. An article in the November 1922 issue of Radio Broadcast magazine lamented that "driblets of advertising... are floating through the ether every day" and expressed concern that "The woods are full of opportunists who are restrained by no scruples when the scent of profit comes down the wind." Even though until the mid-1920s a few stations held out against carrying commercials, no other financing scheme proved practical, and by the late-1920s most U.S. radio stations were carrying commercially sponsored programs.

During radio's golden age, advertisers sponsored entire programs, usually with some sort of message like "We thank our sponsors for making this program possible", airing at the beginning or end of a program. While radio had the obvious limitation of being restricted to sound, as the industry developed, large stations began to experiment with different formats. Advertising had become a hot commodity and there was money to be made. E. H. Sanders, advertising director at Shell Oil Co., urged radio broadcasters to deal directly with relevant advertisers, and sell tie-in commercial spots for established radio programs. Like newspaper ads at the time, Sanders figured that advertisers and radio would both benefit from selling ad spots to get the attention of listeners. Radio was an already prominent medium, but Sanders referred to his initiative as radio 'growing up' in terms of its business aspects and how it dealt with advertising. The "visual" portion of the broadcast was supplied by the listener's boundless imagination. Comedian and voice actor Stan Freberg demonstrated this point on his radio show in 1957, using sound effects to dramatize the towing of a 10-ton maraschino cherry by the Royal Canadian Air Force, who dropped it onto a 700-ft. mountain of whipped cream floating in hot-chocolate filled Lake Michigan, to the cheering of 25,000 extras. The bit was later used by the USA's Radio Advertising Bureau to promote radio commercials.

The radio industry has changed significantly over time, and radio is big business today. Although other media and new technologies now place more demands on consumer's time, 95% of people still listen to the radio every week. U.S. Internet radio listening is also growing rapidly, rising from 12% in 2002 to over 50% in 2015. Although consumers have more choices today, a 2009 study reported that 92% of listeners stay tuned in when commercials break into their programming.

Formats 
There is a broad range of choices for type and length of radio commercials. With changes in the radio industry and better production technologies, the mode of commercial presentation has changed, and commercial advertisements can take on a wide range of forms. The two primary types of radio ads are "live reads" and produced spots.

Cousin to the ad-libbed commercial, live read refers to when a DJ reads an advertiser's spot on the air, delivered from a script, fact sheet or personal knowledge. It can also refer to when the DJ "endorses" the advertiser's goods or services. The Radio Advertising Bureau (RAB) defines an endorsement as: "where the station or personality "endorses" the advertiser's product or service, usually "live" on-air."

Produced spots appear to be more common. A spot is 'produced' if the radio station or an advertising agency record it for the client. Produced commercial formats include: straight read with sound effects or background music, dialogue, monologue (where the voice talent portrays a character, as opposed to an announcer), jingles, and combinations of these. Studies show that the quality of the commercials is as important to listeners, generally, as the number of ads they hear.

Research and rates 
Radio stations today generally run their advertising in clusters or sets, scattered throughout the broadcasting hour.  Studies show that the first or second commercial to air during a commercial break has higher recall than those airing later in the set.

Nielsen Audio is one of the primary providers of ratings data in the United States. Most radio stations and advertising agencies subscribe to this paid service, because ratings are key in the broadcast industry. Ad agencies generally purchase radio based on a target demographic. For example, their client may want to reach men between 18 and 49 years old. The ratings enable advertisers to select a specific segment of the listening audience and purchase airtime accordingly. Ratings are also referred to as "numbers" in the business.

The numbers can show who is listening to a particular station, the most popular times of day for listeners in that group, and the percentage of the total listening audience that can be reached with a particular schedule of advertisements. The numbers also show exactly how many people are listening at each hour of the day. This allows an advertiser to select the strongest stations in the market with specificity and tells them what times of day will be the best times to run their ads.

Besides the basic numbers, most radio stations have access to other data, such as Scarborough Research, that details more about the listening audience than just what age group they fall into.  For example, some data will provide the types of activities listeners participate in, their ethnicity, what type of employment they do, their income levels, what kinds of cars they drive, and even whether or not they have been to a particular entertainment venue.

Radio stations sell their airtime according to dayparts. Typically, a station's daypart lineup will look something like the following:  6am-10am, 10am-3pm, 3pm-7pm, and 7pm- midnight. The spots running after midnight, from 12am-6am, are referred to as "overnights". Though this schedule of dayparts can vary from station to station, most stations run similar daypart lineups and sell their advertisements accordingly. Drive times, or morning and evenings when people are commuting, are usually the most popular times of day and also when each station has the most listeners. The "rates", or what the station charges the advertiser, will reflect that.

Rates can also be affected by the time of year an advertiser runs.  January is almost always a very slow time of year, and many stations run specials on their rates during that month. This is not the case in warm weather markets like Florida, where "snow birds" migrate and increase population.  In this situation rates are usually at their highest as the population swells. The cost of radio advertising also varies on how well the parties negotiate. During busier times of the year, stations can actually sell out of ads entirely, because, unlike the print media, radio stations only have a limited number of commercial units available per hour.  During the dot-com boom, some stations ran as much as twenty minutes of ads per hour.  While commercial levels are nowhere near as high today, with the average station running approximately nine minutes of ads per hour, peak periods can and do sell out.

Thus, advertising rates will vary depending on time of year, time of day, how well the station does in the particular demographic an advertiser is trying to reach, how well a station does compared to other stations, and demand on station inventory. The busier the time of year for the station, the more an advertiser can expect to spend. And, the higher ranked a station is in the market, according to the ratings data, the more an advertiser can expect to get charged to run on that station.

Advertising rates can vary depending on the length of spot the advertisers elects to run. Although sixty second spots are the most common, stations also sell airtime in thirty, fifteen, ten and two second intervals.  Thirty-second ads have always been popular in television advertising, but radio stations just adopted this format recently. Clear Channel kicked off the "Less is More" initiative in 2004, utilizing thirty-second commercials in markets across the US. Though studies show that fewer commercials cause better recall rates, research indicates that traditional sixty-second spots may be the better option, with higher brand and message recall than the newer thirty-second ads.

Stations also run ten-second spots, or "billboards".  Typically, this type of spot runs adjacent to some station feature, such as the traffic report, stating, "This traffic brought to you by…", and is usually limited to about thirty words. Fifteen-second spots are generally reserved for station promotional announcements, although some stations sell them.

In addition to traditional radio advertising, some stations are selling airtime during their streaming broadcasts. In the past, the radio station stream included only the commercials that were also running on air. CBS announced it would begin airing 'live reads' in its streaming radio broadcasts, sold and voiced separately from the stations' regular spots, noting the efficacy of live endorsements.

Efficacy 
More than eight out of ten Americans feel listening to commercials in exchange for free radio is a "fair deal". Furthermore, broadcast radio advertising often offers the advantage of being localized and inexpensive in comparison with other mediums such as television. Thus, radio advertising can be an effective, low-cost medium through which a business can reach their target consumer. Studies show that radio ads create emotional reactions in listeners.  In turn, consumers perceive the ads as more relevant to them personally,  which can lead to increased market awareness and sales for businesses running ad schedules. Twenty-five percent of listeners say they're more interested in a product or business when they hear about it on their preferred station.

Local DJs create a personal relationship with their listening audience, and that audience is more likely to trust what they say and respond to their message. Live endorsements are growing in popularity, as advertisers seek new means to reach consumers and cut through the surrounding clutter.  Studies show that live reads have recall and response rates higher than the typical recorded spot. Perhaps because of the relationship listeners develop with their favorite station, twenty-six percent of listeners are more interested in a product or business when a DJ endorses it. As more advertisers turn to live endorsements, heavy demand is placed on DJs to announce them.  And, as the number of available DJs shrinks, those that are left are often inundated with requests to do endorsements.

Regulatory considerations 
The Communications Act of 1934 established the FCC, which, in turn, regulates the broadcasting media. In response to the payola scandal of the 1950s, the FCC established guidelines, known as "sponsorship disclosure" rules. These rules apply to both pay-for-play and advertisements alike, recognizing that consumers deserve to know "by whom they are being persuaded".

Of particular importance to advertisers is Section 317 of the Act, the "Announcement of Payment For Broadcast" provision. It states, in general terms, that where money, services or other valuables are directly or indirectly paid to a radio station in exchange for mentions on the air, the station must disclose that fact. For example, if a cell phone provider gives a free cell phone to a station's DJ, who then talks about that cell-phone provider on the air, perhaps mentioning what great service he has, the announcer must disclose that it is an advertisement.

Usually, listeners are able to discern radio advertisements from entertainment content. The Communications Act does include an "obviousness" exception: where it is obvious that something is a commercial, the announcement-for-payment provision does not apply. However, where anything of value has changed hands in exchange for mentions on the air, a station has a duty to disclose it.

The Federal Trade Commission is also responsible for broadcast industry regulation, in terms of false or misleading advertising practices. In October 2009, the FTC published guidelines regarding endorsements, requiring clear disclosure of the connection between an advertiser and an endorser. Under the FTC guidelines, an endorser is responsible for disclosing any "material connections" they have with a seller/business.

In recent years, there has been a trend toward the blurring of entertainment/editorial and advertising content. Marketers are "embedding" products into the media so that consumers are not aware they are being advertised to. In radio, it is sometimes difficult to tell where DJ chit-chat ends and an advertisement begins.

See also 
 Jingle
 Promo (media)

References

External links
"Cost of Advertising on Radio in India, Best Radio Advertising Cost in India" (exopicmedia.com)
"Selling Stuff During the Golden Age of Radio" by Danny Goodwin (old-time.com)
"Zoot Radio: Free old time radio show downloads of radio commercials during the Golden Age of Radio" (zootradio.com)
"Various Radio Channels for Advertising" by The Media Ant (themediaant.com)
"Financing Radio Broadcasting: Commercial Sponsorship" by Thomas H. White (earlyradiohistory.us)
"What Makes a Great Radio Ad" (radiocreative.com)

Advertising by medium
Radio broadcasting